Torfaen is a county borough in the south-east of Wales. Torfaen is bordered by the county of Monmouthshire to the east, the city of Newport to the south, and the county boroughs of Caerphilly and Blaenau Gwent to the south-west and north-west. It is within the boundaries of the historic county of Monmouthshire, and between 1974 and 1996 was a district of Gwent, until it was reconstituted as a principal area in 1996.

Etymology
Torfaen (meaning "breaker of stones") is an old name for the river – today called Afon Lwyd ("grey river") – which flows through the county borough from its source north of Blaenavon southward through Abersychan, Pontypool, and Cwmbran. The last three towns mentioned are a contiguous urban area.

History
The borough was formed in 1974 as a local government district of Gwent. It covered the whole area of three former districts and two parishes from another two districts, which were all abolished at the same time:
Blaenavon Urban District
Cwmbran Urban District
Henllys parish from Magor and St Mellons Rural District
Llanfrechfa Lower parish from Pontypool Rural District
Pontypool Urban District
All the constituent parts of Torfaen had previously been in the administrative county of Monmouthshire prior to the reforms. Gwent County Council provided county-level services to the new borough.

Torfaen was reconstituted in 1996 as a county borough, taking over the county-level functions from the abolished Gwent County Council. The area is now governed by Torfaen County Borough Council, which is a principal council.

Torfaen has its own museum Torfaen Museum, in Pontypool Park, Pontypool.

Area characteristics
The area has a population of around 91,000. Much of the southern part of the county borough around Cwmbran is extensively urban. The north of the county borough is greener and retains extensive areas of countryside, especially on the route to Blaenavon.

The administrative centre is Pontypool in the centre of the county borough. Most of the administration of Torfaen County Borough Council is conducted from Pontypool Civic Centre.

Local landmarks
The highest point of the county is Coity Mountain.

Pontypool Park

Pontypool Park is the name given to the former principal residence of Pontypool (now a secondary school) and the  park that surrounds it. The park contains Pontypool Leisure Centre and sports facilities and is the home of Pontypool RFC. The park includes a folly, shell grotto and ornamental ponds. Much of the area is given to woodland but there is extensive open grassland. The American Gardens were opened to the public in 2008, after being closed to visitors for many years, and a restoration project is under way. Torfaen County Borough Council is currently mapping all the trees from the park to remove and then replant those dying and diseased.

Cwmbran Centre

Cwmbran Centre is advertised as the second largest under-cover shopping centre in Wales. The centre includes many familiar high-street stores.

Blaenavon

The former coal-mining and iron-working town of Blaenavon in the northern part of the county borough is now a recognised UNESCO World Heritage Site.

Media 
Torfaen has its own community radio station, Vitalize Radio, which is run on a voluntary basis in Pontypool to serve the community. Additionally, Cwmbran has its own community-focused radio station: Able Radio is a volunteer-run radio station  which supports adults with autism and learning disabilities, and claims to be "the first Radio Station run by people with Learning Disabilities and Autism in the world". In recent years, Able Radio station has increased the scope of their activities, including television productions and their gardening project and associated produce shop, SustainAble . There is also the Cwmbran and District Amateur Radio Society, which focuses on ham radio .

There are also various local community news services, most notably Cwmbran Life and Inside Torfaen. The South Wales Argus serves as the main newspaper.

Politics
Torfaen is historically a safe Labour Party seat. At present the MP is Nick Thomas-Symonds. Constituents in Croesyceiliog North, Croesyceiliog South, Llanyrafon North and Llanyrafon South wards are served by the Monmouth MP, Conservative David Davies. Torfaen is also a Senedd constituency, presided over by Labour MS, Lynne Neagle.

Torfaen Council has historically been a Labour-controlled authority, however the 2008 Local Elections saw Labour fail to win enough seats to hold a majority, resulting in a coalition with Plaid Cymru and Independent Councillors.

In the 2022 Local Elections, Labour regained majority control of Torfaen County Borough Council, winning 30 out of a possible 40 seats.

The main council offices for ‘Torfaen County Borough Council’ are situated in The Civic Centre, Pontypool.

Torfaen has six Community Councils, which are:

Blaenavon Town Council.
Croesyceiliog & Llanyrafon Community Council.
Cwmbran Community Council.
Henllys Community Council.
Ponthir Community Council.
Pontypool Community Council.

Education

Secondary schools in the area are:

Abersychan Comprehensive School, Pontypool
Croesyceiliog School, Cwmbran
Cwmbran High School, Cwmbran
St Albans RC High School, Pontypool
West Monmouth School, Pontypool
Ysgol Gymraeg Gwynllyw, Pontypool. (Welsh Medium Education School)

Further education, vocational training and some higher education is provided at Torfaen Learning Zone of Coleg Gwent in Cwmbran centre. Before this, further education was provided at the Pontypool campus

In 2012 Torfaen County Borough Council was criticised for keeping 2,400 laptop computers, originally intended to be used by secondary school pupils and teachers, unused for at least a year "because it couldn't figure out what to do" with the equipment, which originally cost over a million pounds.

Railways
Services are operated by Transport for Wales. There is also the Pontypool and Blaenavon Railway in Blaenavon.

See also
List of Scheduled Monuments in Torfaen
Grade I listed buildings in Torfaen
Grade II* listed buildings in Torfaen

References

External links

Torfaen County Borough Council
American Gardens, Pontypool Park
Cwmbran, A Short History
Blaenavon, World Heritage Site
Torfaen constituency breakdown, 2001
Council and Democracy in Torfaen
Torfaen - Coat of arms (crest) of Torfaen

 
Principal areas of Wales
County boroughs of Wales
1974 establishments in Wales
Gwent (county)